The Clemson Tigers men's basketball teams of 1990–1999 represented Clemson University in NCAA college basketball competition.

1989–90

Clemson's participation in the 1990 NCAA Tournament was vacated by the Committee on Infractions.

1990–91

1991–92

1992–93

1993–94

1994–95

1995–96

1996–97

1997–98

1998–99

References

Games: 
Coaches: 

1990